"If You Can Do Anything Else" is a song written by Billy Livsey and Don Schlitz, and recorded by American country music artist George Strait.  It was released in February 2001 as the third and final single from his self-titled album.  The song reached number 5 on the U.S. Billboard Hot Country Singles & Tracks chart in July 2001. It also peaked at number 51 on the U.S. Billboard Hot 100.

Content
The song is about man who is giving his woman the option to leave him. He gives her many different options for all the things she can do. At the end he gives her the option to stay with him if she really can’t find anything else to do. He says he will be alright if she leaves, but really it seems he wants her to stay.

Chart performance
"If You Can Do Anything Else" debuted at number 60 on the U.S. Billboard Hot Country Singles & Tracks for the week of March 3, 2001.

Year-end charts

References

2001 singles
2000 songs
George Strait songs
Songs written by Billy Livsey
Songs written by Don Schlitz
Song recordings produced by Tony Brown (record producer)
MCA Nashville Records singles